This article presents the complete oeuvre of Dutch multi-instrumentalist and composer Maurice de Jong, including his work as a band member and collaborating artist.

As a solo artist

Astral

Studio albums

The Nefarious Cult

Studio albums

Ophiuchus

Studio albums

De Magia Veterum

Studio albums

EPs

Gnaw Their Tongues

Studio albums

EPs

Collaborative albums

Compilation albums

Temple Of Will

EPs

Cloak of Altering

Studio albums

EPs

Seirom

Studio albums

EPs

Malorum

Studio albums

Pyriphlegethon

Studio albums

EPs

Caput Mortuum

Studio albums

EPs

Canticle

Studio albums

Offerbeest

Studio albums

EPs

Hagetisse

Studio albums

With a band

Aderlating

Studio albums

EPs

Collaborative albums

It Only Gets Worse

Studio albums

EPs

Mors Sonat

Studio albums

References

External links
Mories Discography
Mories at Discogs

Discographies of Dutch artists
Rock music discographies